Sita Marhi Natyashala, in the Sita Marhi archaeological site in Sarguja district in the Indian state of Chhattisgarh, is believed to be the oldest theatre in the world. It is found in a cave-like structure.

As a matter of fact that can be seen a scripture carved on rock that is said to be created by the court poet in admiration of the court dancer, and thus claims to be one of ancient most public expression of the most basic human sentiment-love.

See also 
 Ramgarh, Ambikapur
 Ramgarh, Chhattisgarh

Buildings and structures in Chhattisgarh
Theatres in India
Cultural history of India
Surguja district